This is a list of awards received by the British girl group Sugababes.

BMI Pop Awards 

|-
| 2005
| "Hole in the Head"
| Pop Award
|

Brit Awards 
The Brit Awards are the British Phonographic Industry's annual popular music awards. Sugababes has received one award from eight nominations. Sugababes as only British Dance Act winning girl group.

Capital FM Awards

Cosmopolitan Ultimate Women of the Year Awards

Disney Channel Kids Awards

Elle Style Awards

Eska Music Awards

Glamour Awards

Ivor Novello Awards 

|-
| 2004
| "Hole in the Head"
| Most Performed Work
|

MOBO Awards

MTV Europe Music Awards

NME Awards 
{| class="wikitable"
|-
!Year
!width="250"|Recipient
!width="300"|Award
!width="60"|Result
!Ref.
|-
| 2001
| Sugababes
| Best R&B/Soul Act
| 
|

Nickelodeon Kids' Choice Awards

Pop Factory Awards 
{| class="wikitable"
|-
!Year
!width="250"|Recipient
!width="300"|Award
!width="60"|Result
!Ref.
|-
| 2002
| Sugababes
| Best Pop Act
| 
|

Popjustice £20 Music Prize

Q Awards

Radio Forth Awards

Smash Hits Poll Winners Party

TMF Awards

TOTP Awards

Virgin Music Awards

References 

British music-related lists
Lists of awards received by British musician
Awards and nominations